Blair Thomas Fagan Tarrant (born 11 May 1990) is a New Zealand field hockey player who plays as a defender for German club Hamburger Polo Club and the New Zealand national team.

He represented his country at the 2016 Summer Olympics in Rio de Janeiro, where the men's team came seventh.

Club career
Tarrant plays as a defender for the Southern region in the New Zealand Hockey League. In 2012 he signed a two-year contract at SCHC in the Netherlands. Due to his commitments to the national team, he would miss the preparation for the second half of the season so in January 2013 his contract at SCHC was annulled and he returned to New Zealand. After the 2016 Summer Olympics he returned to the Netherlands to play for Rotterdam. In April 2020, it was announced he left Rotterdam together with Kane Russell for Hamburger Polo Club in Germany for the 2020–21 season.

References

External links

1990 births
Living people
New Zealand male field hockey players
Olympic field hockey players of New Zealand
Male field hockey defenders
Field hockey players at the 2010 Commonwealth Games
2014 Men's Hockey World Cup players
Field hockey players at the 2014 Commonwealth Games
Field hockey players at the 2016 Summer Olympics
Field hockey players at the 2020 Summer Olympics
Field hockey players at the 2022 Commonwealth Games
2018 Men's Hockey World Cup players
Commonwealth Games medallists in field hockey
Commonwealth Games bronze medallists for New Zealand
Sportspeople from Timaru
HC Rotterdam players
Men's Hoofdklasse Hockey players
SCHC players
2023 Men's FIH Hockey World Cup players
20th-century New Zealand people
21st-century New Zealand people
New Zealand expatriate sportspeople in Germany
Medallists at the 2010 Commonwealth Games